1983 World Masters Athletics Championships is the fifth in a series of World Masters Athletics Outdoor Championships (called World Veterans Games or World Masters Games at the time) that took place in San Juan, Puerto Rico, from 23 to 30 September 1983.

The main venue was Estadio Sixto Escobar,

while Parque Central hosted most field events.

Opening ceremonies were held at Hiram Bithorn Stadium.

The mascot was the jicotea, a freshwater turtle sacred to the indigenous Taíno peoples.

This edition of masters athletics Championships had a minimum age limit of 35 years for women and 40 years for men.

The governing body of this series is World Association of Veteran Athletes (WAVA). WAVA was formed during meeting at the inaugural edition of this series at Toronto in 1975, then officially founded during the second edition in 1977, then renamed as World Masters Athletics (WMA) at the Brisbane Championships in 2001.

This Championships was organized by WAVA in coordination with a Local Organising Committee (LOC) led by José F. Méndez, with San Juan Mayor Hernán Padilla serving as "Patron of the Games".

In addition to a full range of track and field events,

non-stadia events included 10K Cross Country, 10K Race Walk (women), 20K Race Walk (men), and Marathon.
The relays were run as unofficial events on the final day,

since the WAVA by-laws had been amended at the 1981 Championships to suspend relays in 1983.

Controversy
Funding for this Championships from the Puerto Rico Commonwealth was withheld by Governor Carlos Romero Barcelo, a political rival of Mayor Padilla, ostensibly over concerns of South Africa participation due to the apartheid policy of the South African government at that time.

South African athletes were officially banned from this Championships by the Puerto Rican government, despite the IAAF constitution that prohibits discrimination because of national origin.

Many proceedings of the Championships were poorly organized, partly as a consequence of this political dispute.

About 30 of the 178 registered South African athletes eventually competed despite the ban, but they were listed under "alternate" countries, as was done at the 1981 Championships in Christchurch.

Results
Past Championships results are archived at WMA.

Additional archives are available from Museum of Masters Track & Field

as a pdf book,

as a searchable pdf,

in pdf newsletters from National Masters News,

and also as a pdf booklet of Championships and world records.

Several masters world records were set at this Championships. World records for 1983 are from the Museum of Masters Track & Field searchable pdf unless otherwise noted.

The blind sprinter Fritz Assmy, guided by his son and running his assigned lane 8, defeated Payton Jordan in 2 of 3 events in a memorable dual.

Both athletes broke the M65 200m WR in their respective heats, and though Jordan had a faster time of 26.10 in his heat

than Assmy's 26.20,

Assmy won the final in a non-record time of 26.26 to Jordan's 26.42.

Some thought the son had "pulled" or "tugged" Assmy in the first 2 events, the 100m and 200m, but it appeared Assmy was doing the "pulling" in the 400m.

Assmy later defended his running technique in the June 1985 National Masters News newsletter.

Women

Men

References

World Masters Athletics Championships
World Masters Athletics Championships
International athletics competitions hosted by Puerto Rico
1983
Masters athletics (track and field) records